Oedipina complex, commonly known as the Gamboa worm salamander, is a species of lungless salamander found in western South America from Costa Rica to western Colombia and north-western Ecuador. This species inhabits humid tropical lowland forest where it can be found on the ground, and on bushy vegetation, logs and rocks. It can also be found on forest edges, but it does not survive in degraded areas. Deforestation is a threat to this species.

When disturbed, they may play dead in order to confuse potential predators.

References

External links

Oedipina
Amphibians of Colombia
Amphibians of Costa Rica
Amphibians of Ecuador
Amphibians of Panama
Amphibians described in 1924